La Nou de Berguedà is a municipality in the comarca of Berguedà, Catalonia. Located on the left bank of the Llobregat River, it is most noted as a destination for outdoor activities. In particular, the mountain of Sobrepuny is a popular hiking destination.

History
The town is first recorded as a place name in 948, and is also recorded as having had part of its territory ceded to the Monastery of Ripoll in 1003.

Places of interest
Mountain of Sobrepuny
Roca de Lliri
Sanctuary of Lourdes de La Nou, neoclassical, from the 19th century.

References

External links
Town Website 
 Government data pages 

Municipalities in Berguedà